Kachua Union is an Union parishad of Kachua Upazila, Bagerhat District in Khulna Division of Bangladesh. It has an area of 26.06 km2 (10.06 sq mi) and a population of 30,790.

References

Unions of Kachua Upazila
Unions of Bagerhat District
Unions of Khulna Division